Timothy Paul "Ted" Sullivan (March 17, 1851 – July 5, 1929) was an Irish born manager and player in Major League Baseball who was born in County Clare, Ireland.

Career
After attending St. Mary's College (in St. Mary's, Kansas) and Saint Louis University, he managed four teams during the 1880s, one of which was the  St. Louis Maroons of the Union Association, which finished with an astonishing 94-19 record. He began the year with a 28–3 record, but moved on in midseason to manage another UA team, the Kansas City Cowboys; Fred Dunlap took over in St. Louis, compiling a 66–16 record as the Maroons won the UA pennant in the league's only year of existence. Kansas City was a dismal 3-17 when Sullivan took over managerial duties, going 13-46 the rest of way. During his time in Kansas City, he also made his only three field appearances, playing two games in right field and one as a shortstop; he collected three hits in nine at bats. He did not manage again until the  Washington Nationals, then 10-29, hired him to finish out the season. He led the team to a mark of 38-57, and ended his major league career with a record of 132-132.

Sullivan is considered a pioneer of early baseball; he founded both the Northwest League and the Texas League, both minor leagues that still exist and thrive today. Credited with discovering Charles Comiskey, he is considered by some to be the first person to emphasize the importance of scouting. Also, Sullivan was a great promoter of the game; he would tell stories of baseball's beginnings, and of its many star players. He authored books detailing these, including a barnstorming trip around the world in 1913–1914 by Comiskey's Chicago White Sox and the New York Giants. He also credited himself as the originator of the word "fan", as in baseball fan. Sullivan later became a team executive and owner.

Post-career
Sullivan died in Washington, D.C. at the age of 78, and is interred at Calvary Catholic Cemetery in Milwaukee, Wisconsin.

See also
List of Major League Baseball player–managers
List of players from Ireland in Major League Baseball

References

External links
Baseball-Reference.com – career managing record and playing statistics
Nebraska Press: The Tour to End All Tours – account of Charles Comiskey's 1913–1914 baseball world tour, recounts his early association with Sullivan
Ted Sullivan at Amazon.com
review of The Tour to End All Tours
A Most Impressive Man - Ted Sullivan - Shamrock Club's Emerald Reflections

Major League Baseball right fielders
St. Louis Browns (AA) managers
St. Louis Maroons managers
Kansas City Cowboys (UA) managers
Washington Nationals (1886–1889) managers
19th-century baseball players
Major League Baseball players from Ireland
Irish baseball players
Irish emigrants to the United States (before 1923)
Sportspeople from County Clare
1851 births
1929 deaths
Burials in Wisconsin
Minor league baseball managers
Richmond Virginias players
Memphis Reds players
Milwaukee Brewers (minor league) players
Chattanooga Chatts players
Nashville Tigers players
Atlanta Atlantas players
Dallas Steers players
New Haven Texas Steers players
Montgomery Senators players
Major League Baseball player-managers
Washington Senators (minor league) players
Saint Louis University alumni